The Calvin T. Macomber House is a historic house located at 312 W. Brittania Street in Taunton, Massachusetts. It was built in 1885 for Calvin T. Macomber, who was employed at Reed & Barton. It among the most complex examples of the Queen Anne style houses in the city, with an asymmetrical plan and a variety of architectural details.  It has a steep hip roof, which is broken up by tall chimneys, projecting sections, and gabled dormers.  Second floor windows have trim decorated with floral motifs.

The house was added to the National Register of Historic Places in 1984.

See also
National Register of Historic Places listings in Taunton, Massachusetts

References

National Register of Historic Places in Taunton, Massachusetts
Houses in Taunton, Massachusetts
Houses on the National Register of Historic Places in Bristol County, Massachusetts